Wirestem muhly is a common name for two closely related plants and may refer to:

Muhlenbergia frondosa
Muhlenbergia mexicana, native to the United States and Canada